Zaure Sadvokasovna Omarova (1924-2008) was a Soviet-Kazakhstani Politician (Communist).

She served as Minister of Social Security.

References

1924 births
20th-century Kazakhstani women politicians
20th-century Kazakhstani politicians
Soviet women in politics
Kazakhstani communists
Women government ministers of Kazakhstan
2008 deaths